The University of Bojnord is a public university located in Bojnord, Iran.

As the grand university of the province, university of Bojnord was established on October 2005 at the center of North Khorasan, Bojnord, in order to fulfill its main mission of educating young people in different levels and fields of study in line with the programs approved by the Ministry of Science, Research and Technology.

The approval for the establishment of the University of Bojnord, with four faculties of Engineering, Humanities, Arts and Sciences was issued by the Ministry of Science, Research and Technology at 1383/11/11 (01/31/2005) under the letter No. 22/8621. Thus, on October 2005, with the assistance of various provincial organizations, including the General Governor of North Khorasan, Bojnord Governorate, North Khorasan Education Organization, Islamic Council of Bojnord, Bojnord Municipality and Khorasan Petrochemical Company, University of Bojnord enrolled 210 students in three fields of study, as the beginning step.

In the academic year 2019-2020, about 4600 students studied under the tuition of 172 faculty members in 53 academic fields (27 undergraduate and 24 postgraduate degrees).

References

External links
Official website

Boj
Education in North Khorasan Province